World Lethwei Championship (also known as WLC) is a Lethwei promotion based in Yangon, Myanmar. The promotion brought to the millennia-old Burmese martial of Lethwei to UFC Fight Pass and showcased it to the world. The WLC events combined the historic traditions of Lethwei with modern entertainment.

History

Formation 
The success of ONE Championship's mixed martial arts events in Myanmar caught the eye of Zaykabar Company Vice-Chairman Zay Thiha, who decided to bring world-class Lethwei events the world. The businessman started Lekkha Moun Co in 2015 and the World Lethwei Championship was officially founded in August 2017 by Zay Thiha and investors, as a subsidiary of Lekkha Moun Co.

Inaugural event 
In 2017, WLC signed Myanmar's top Lethwei fighters Tun Tun Min & Too Too. The first WLC event, titled WLC 1: The Great Beginning, was held on 3 March 2017 at Mingalardon Event Zone in Mingaladon Township, Yangon, Myanmar.

Signing Dave Leduc 
In March 2019, the promotion announced that it had signed Lethwei superstar Dave Leducto an exclusive contract. The exclusive contract would made it impossible for him to defend his various titles from other promotions. Leduc held a press conference at the Karaweik Palace in Yangon to announce that he was vacating three of his four Lethwei world titles.

For Leduc's promotional debut at WLC 9: King of Nine Limbs, the WLC signed former UFC welterweight Seth Baczynski. Leduc knocked out Baczynski with punches to win the inaugural WLC Cruiserweight Championship. The event received a significant viewership success on UFC Fight Pass and won multiple awards in Asia such as the 2019 Best Sport Program at The Asian Academy Awards. Leduc received a $50,000 bonus for his performance and marketing efforts.

International expansion 
In October 2019, while on The Joe Rogan Experience podcast, Dave Leduc announced that the organization had plans to host an historical event in the United States. At the pre-fight press conference for WLC 11: Battlebones, WLC executive director Sein Phyo Hlaing revealed plans to expand globally in 2020, beginning with Cambodia, Thailand, Japan and the United States. As the promotion expands internationally, it plans to sign even more free-agents with recognizable names to compete in Lethwei.

ONE Championship partnership 
In 2017, showed interest in co-promoting events in order to expand globally and there was rumours the organization could co-promote with the US-based Bare Knuckle Fighting Championship (BKFC). However, the WLC officially entered into a partnership to share fighters with the mixed martial arts promotion ONE Championship. Both parties agreed on sending athletes to fight in each other's organization.

On June 30, 2017, in a collaboration between ONE and WLC, the organizations held a Lethwei dark match at ONE Championship: Light of a Nation, a contest between Soe Htet Oo and Thway Thit Win Hlaing. Soe Htet Oo would end up losing a decision according to WLC point system where a winner must be chosen by judges decision if the fight goes there is no stoppage. As of 2022, there has been rumours of WLC Champion Dave Leduc crossing over to ONE Championship under Lethwei rules.

Women division 
Cambodia's Nou Srey Pov became the first female winner in World Lethwei Championship, defeating Shwe Sin Min and Shwe Nadi in 2018. 

In 2019, WLC announced it will commit to the female Lethwei division with a dedicated female match at every event. It held its first female fight after the announcement featuring France's Souris Manfredi and Eh Yanut from Cambodia at WLC 9: King of Nine Limbs on 2 August in Mandalay, Myanmar. Manfredi became the first winner of the newly created women’s division by defeating Yanut.

Broadcast

Myanmar 
Sky Net was the first television channel to broadcast the WLC events live in Myanmar and were then delayed telecast in over 40 countries worldwide.

In 2018, WLC signed a broadcasting deal with international broadcaster Canal+ for exclusive broadcasting rights in Myanmar.

Outside Myanmar 
The end of 2018, the WLC marked Lethwei history by signing a deal with the Ultimate Fighting Championship and having its first Lethwei event broadcast live on UFC Fight Pass. World Lethwei Championship is also available in over 100 countries through broadcast deals with Fight Network, Arena Sport, Fox Sports, Star Sports, Bayon Television, Titan Channel, Sport Extra and StarTimes.

Sponsorship 
 Fuso
 AGD Bank
 UFC Fight Pass
 Canal+
 SPEED Energy Drink
 5BB Broadband
 Max Myanmar Group and Consumer Goods Myanmar Co.
 Fightbro
 Sogo Plastics

Events

Champions

World Champions

Myanmar National Champion

World championship history

Cruiserweight Championship 
Weight limit:  to

Middleweight Championship 
Weight limit:  to

Light Middleweight Championship 
Weight limit:  to

Light Welterweight Championship 
Weight limit:  to

Women's Bantamweight Championship 
Weight limit:  to

Rules 
The WLC uses the modern Lethwei rules also known as tournament rules first established in 1996 by the Myanmar Lethwei Federation.

Rounds 
Each bout can be booked as a 3, 4 or 5 round fight with 3 minutes per round and a 2-minute break in between rounds. Championship bouts are 5 round fights with 3 minutes per round and a 2-minute break between rounds.

Judging 
In the event that a bout goes the distance, it will go to the judges decision. The 3 judges will score the bout based on number of strikes per round. Fighters have a maximum of 3 knockdowns per round and 4 knockdowns in the entire fight before the fight is ruled a knockout.

Weight classes

Awards 
 Lethwei World
 2019 Lethwei Promotion of the year
 2019 Event of the Year 
Spia Asia Awards
 2019 Best Sport Tourism Destination Campaign of the Year - Bronze 
Asian Academy Awards
 2019 Best Sport Program - National Winner

Notable fighters 

  Tun Tun Min
  Dave Leduc
  Too Too
  Soe Lin Oo
  Mite Yine
  Saw Ba Oo
  Sasha Moisa
  Artur Saladiak
  Naimjon Tuhtaboyev
  Nguyễn Trần Duy Nhất
  Umar Semata
  Seth Baczynski

See also

Myanmar Traditional Lethwei Federation
List of Lethwei fighters

References

External links
 
 WLC Official Website 
 WLC YouTube channel 

World Lethwei Championship
Lethwei organizations
Kickboxing organizations
Sport in Myanmar
Sports organizations established in 2015
2015 establishments in Myanmar